The 41st Daytime Creative Arts Emmy Awards ceremony, which honors the crafts behind American daytime television programming, was held at the Westin Bonaventure Hotel in Los Angeles on June 20, 2014. The event was presented in conjunction with the 41st Daytime Emmy Awards by the National Academy of Television Arts and Sciences. The nominations were announced on May 1, 2014.

Winners and nominees

In the lists below, the winner of the category is in bold.

Animated programs

Children's Series

Drama Series

Lifestyle, Culinary, and Travel programs

Outstanding New Approaches

Series

Special Classes

Multiple wins
By network
 PBS – 12
 Nickelodeon – 10
 Syndicated – 10
 CBS – 8
 Hub Network – 6
 TOLN.com – 5
 ABC – 3
 Cooking Channel – 3
 Cartoon Network – 2
 MeTV – 2
 YouTube.com – 2
 Disney Channel – 1
 HGTV – 1
 www.mlpromise.com – 1
 MTV – 1
 OWN – 1

By program
 Sesame Street – 6
 The Ellen DeGeneres Show – 5
 The Bold and the Beautiful – 4
 Peg + Cat – 3
 All My Children – 3
 Giada In Paradise – 3
 Peter Rabbit – 3
 The Young and the Restless – 3
 Bubble Guppies – 2
 General Hospital – 2
 Green Screen Adventures – 2
 Kung Fu Panda: Legends of Awesomeness – 2
 Ocean Mysteries with Jeff Corwin – 2
 One Life to Live – 2
 The Scarecrow – 2
 Star Wars: The Clone Wars – 2
 Transformers Prime Beast Hunters: Predacons Rising – 2

Multiple nominations 
By network
 PBS – 41
 Nickelodeon – 37
 Syndicated – 32 
 CBS – 30
 Hub Network – 23
 ABC – 16
 Cartoon Network – 10
 NBC – 10
 Disney Channel – 8
 TOLN.com – 8
 ABC Family – 5
 YouTube.com – 4
 Cooking Channel – 3
 MeTV – 3
 OWN – 3
 MTV – 2
 Netflix – 2
 Blueworldtv.com – 1
 CNN – 1
 Disney XD – 1
 Fusion – 1
 Hallmark Channel – 1
 HBO – 1
 HGTV – 1
 www.mlpromise.com – 1
 mtvU – 1
 Sprout – 1

By program
 Sesame Street – 15
 The Young and the Restless – 11
 The Bold and the Beautiful – 10
 Days of Our Lives – 8
 The Ellen DeGeneres Show – 8
 General Hospital – 8
 Peter Rabbit – 8
 Sofia the First – 6
 Spooksville – 6
 The Aquabats! Super Show! – 5
 Disney Parks Christmas Day Parade – 5
 Kung Fu Panda: Legends of Awesomeness – 5
 The Mind of a Chef – 5
 R.L. Stine's The Haunting Hour – 5
 All My Children – 4
 One Life to Live – 4
 Peg + Cat – 4
 Star Wars: The Clone Wars – 4
 Beware the Batman - Episode: "Secrets" – 3
 Born to Explore with Richard Wiese – 3
 Giada In Paradise – 3
 Green Screen Adventures – 3
 Joseph Rosendo's Travelscope – 3
 Made in Israel – 3
 Monsters vs. Aliens – 3
 Ocean Mysteries with Jeff Corwin – 3
 This Old House – 3
 The Wonder Pets! – 3
 Rachael Ray (TV series) – 3
 The Talk – 3
 Transformers Prime Beast Hunters: Predacons Rising – 3
 America Now – 2
 Arthur – 2
 Bubble Guppies – 2
 CBS Sunday Morning – 2
 Curious George – 2
 Dan Vs. – 2
 The Fresh Beat Band – 2
 Jack Hanna's Into the Wild – 2
 The Queen Latifah Show – 2
 Sabrina: Secrets of a Teenage Witch – 2
 The Scarecrow – 2
 Superbook – 2
 Super Soul Sunday – 2
 Teenage Mutant Ninja Turtles – 2
 Turbo FAST – 2

References 

041 Creative Arts
2014 television awards
2014 in American television